Stephen James Merchant (born 24 November 1974) is an English comedian, actor, director, presenter and writer.

Alongside Ricky Gervais, Merchant was the co-writer and co-director of the British TV comedy series The Office (2001–2003), and co-writer, co-director, and co-star of both Extras (2005–2007) and Life's Too Short (2011–2013). With Gervais and Karl Pilkington, he hosted The Ricky Gervais Show in its radio, podcast, audiobook, and television formats; the radio version won a bronze Sony Award. He also provided the voice of the robotic "Intelligence Dampening Sphere" Wheatley in the 2011 video game Portal 2. Merchant co-developed the Sky1 travel series An Idiot Abroad (2010–2012) and co-created Lip Sync Battle (2015–present).

Merchant has performed as a stand-up comedian, which led to him writing and starring in the HBO series Hello Ladies (2013–2014), based on his stand-up material. He starred in his first play, Richard Bean's The Mentalists, at London's Wyndham's Theatre in 2015. He wrote and directed Fighting with My Family in 2019, and in 2021 he starred in, co-wrote, co-produced, and co-directed the 12-part comedy crime series The Outlaws. He also appeared as the mutant Caliban in the superhero film Logan (2017), and as serial killer Stephen Port in the 2022 television drama Four Lives. He has received numerous accolades, including two Golden Globe Awards, three BAFTA Awards, a Primetime Emmy Award, and four British Comedy Awards.

Early life

Stephen James Merchant was born in the Hanham suburb of Bristol on 24 November 1974, the son of nursery nurse Jane Elaine (née Hibbs) and plumber and builder Ronald John Merchant. He attended Hanham Secondary School and later the University of Warwick in Coventry from 1993 to 1996, where he received a 2:1 for his BA in Film and Literature. He worked as a film reviewer on the student radio station Radio Warwick, where he began his broadcasting career. His group there included film critic James King. A number of tapes of The Steve Show have been rediscovered and distributed on various Merchant fan sites.

Merchant was inspired to get into comedy by John Cleese. In 2019, he claimed that he had never met Cleese, but that his parents had recently met Cleese on a cruise ship and asked him to sign a book for Merchant; they also recorded a voicemail message on the phone in their cabin, which consisted of Cleese saying: "Hello there, Mr and Mrs Merchant, I'd be more than happy to sign your book. I was just wondering is your Stephen Merchant the same Stephen Merchant who collaborated with Ricky Gervais on The Office? Because I'm an enormous fan and please pass on my best regards." On hearing this, Merchant said, "I don't feel I need to meet him now. That's all I needed."

Career

Early career
Merchant began his career performing stand-up comedy at Bristol's Comedy Box, where, he recalled: "The first week I did really well. The second week I died on my arse. I realised that stand-up was not that easy after all." He also appeared as a contestant on a 1997 episode of the TV game show Blockbusters and worked for a short time as a DJ for Radio Caroline.

Merchant met Ricky Gervais for the first time in 1997 when Gervais (in the position Head of Speech at the radio station XFM London), hired Merchant as his assistant. Gervais later said that he had called Merchant for an interview because it was the first CV handed to him. Merchant and Gervais hosted a Saturday afternoon radio show together from January through to August 1998, when both of them left XFM as it was bought by the Capital Radio Group. In the same year, Merchant was a finalist at the Daily Telegraph Open Mic Awards.

Merchant worked for seven months at XFM 104.9. The Saturday show never had a large audience. Gervais said: "It's a tinpot radio station... It's not even the biggest radio station in the building." He created the features 'Hip Hop Hooray', 'Make Ricky Gervais Laugh' and 'Song for the Ladies'. After leaving XFM, Merchant began a production course at the BBC. As part of his coursework, he enlisted Gervais to perform in a 30-minute short film, "Seedy Boss", which became the earliest inspiration for their mock documentary The Office. They collaborated on a sitcom pilot called Golden Years featuring a manager suffering a mid-life crisis. It aired on Channel 4's Comedy Lab series in September 1998, but the show failed to find further success.

The Office and return to XFM
In mid-2001, BBC Two aired the first series of The Office, co-written and co-directed by Merchant and Gervais and starring the latter as paper sales office manager David Brent; the show initially received low ratings. Beginning in September 2001, Merchant and Gervais returned to XFM as co-hosts of The Ricky Gervais Show, another Saturday afternoon programme, which led to their fruitful relationship with producer Karl Pilkington.

They took a break from the radio show in mid-2002 in order to film the second series of The Office, which aired that year; in addition to writing and directing the show, Merchant made a cameo performance in the episode "Charity" as a friend of Gareth Keenan's character and known by the name Oggy or Oggmonster. Merchant's father also appeared in multiple episodes as an office handyman named Gordon. Merchant also directed a sitcom pilot called The Last Chancers, which aired on Comedy Lab in November 2002 and became a five-part series broadcast in December on E4.

Merchant and Gervais continued to host The Ricky Gervais Show through 2003, taking another break to film The Office Christmas special, which aired that December. The radio show went off the air indefinitely in January 2004. During 2004, Merchant appeared in a recurring role as a chef on Garth Marenghi's Darkplace and in a cameo on Green Wing, and served as a script associate on the Chris Morris and Charlie Brooker sitcom Nathan Barley. The same year, The Office aired in the U.S. to critical acclaim. It went on to win the Golden Globe Award for Best Television Series – Musical or Comedy which both Merchant and Gervais accepted. This was followed in 2005 by a 4th series of the radio show, consisting of six episodes.

U.S. series of The Office
In March 2005, the American version of The Office premiered, with Merchant and Gervais credited as executive producers. They would later co-write the third-season episode "The Convict", and Merchant would go on to direct the fifth-season episode "Customer Survey".

Podcast series
In December 2005, with sponsorship by The Guardian, Merchant, Gervais and Pilkington began recording a weekly podcast (also called The Ricky Gervais Show). Throughout its first series (through 20 February 2006), the podcast was consistently ranked the most popular in the world, and was certified as the most-downloaded of all time by Guinness World Records. Two more series and three special installments (the "Podfather Trilogy") were recorded in 2006, with the final episode released on Christmas Eve. In late 2008, they recorded four more podcasts and began a series of audiobooks examining Pilkington's perspective on various subjects.

Extras
In July 2005, following a brief return of the XFM radio show (filling in for Adam and Joe), Gervais and Merchant's new sitcom Extras premiered on BBC Two. The series features Merchant in a supporting role as Darren Lamb, the incompetent agent to struggling actor Andy Millman, played by Gervais. Series 2 of Extras aired in late 2006, followed by a Christmas special in December 2007; all three instalments aired on HBO in the United States. Merchant won a 2006 British Comedy Award for Best TV Actor for his performance as Lamb.

The Steve Show

In January 2007, Merchant began hosting his own radio show on BBC 6 Music, airing weekly on Sunday afternoons. Instead of comedy, The Steve Show focused on toast and music, particularly "new music", defined by Merchant as "music you've not heard before." Many of the songs on the show were suggested by listeners or co-presenters. The show also featured several of his friends, including his housemate, his childhood friend, as well as actor Rufus Gerrard-Wright (who also appeared in an episode of Extras). A spring search for a "she-J" resulted in the addition of former Byker Grove actor Sammy T. Dobson joining the ensemble. "The Steve Show" aired for four series and concluded in May 2009.

Stand-up
Merchant began performing stand-up comedy in the late 1990s to critical success, though he decided to focus more on his work with writing partner Ricky Gervais after the success of The Office. Merchant returned to stand-up with a nationwide tour of the United Kingdom in September 2011, under the title Hello Ladies. The tour, which ended in New York, was later released on DVD. In late 2012, the tour continued in Australia and New Zealand. Merchant performed his first-ever stand-up tour of Scandinavia in October 2014, performing in 11 different cities as part of a European festival circuit. In an interview with Marc Maron, Merchant listed Eddie Izzard, Stewart Lee, Ross Noble and Jimmy Carr as stand up comedians he admires and John Cleese as his main comedic influence.

Hello Ladies
Merchant's sitcom Hello Ladies premiered on 29 September 2013 on HBO, in which he played Stuart Pritchard, a website designer in Los Angeles who unsuccessfully chases beautiful women. It was adapted from his stand-up show of the same name. Merchant's frequent partner Ricky Gervais was not involved in any part of the show which was instead written by Merchant, Lee Eisenberg and Gene Stupnitsky. After its initial run of eight episodes, HBO did not renew the show for a second season but aired a special movie on 22 November 2014, that served as the series' last episode.

Other work
Merchant has played small roles in the films Hot Fuzz (2007), Run Fatboy Run (2007), and The Invention of Lying (2009). He has a supporting role in the 2010 film Tooth Fairy. On television, Merchant made a cameo appearance in a non-speaking role on the sixth-season premiere of 24; he also starred as a sports commentator in the unaired pilot No Skillz. In 2009, Merchant and Gervais collaborated on the film Cemetery Junction, set in working-class England in the 1970s, which received mixed reviews on release in 2010.

Later in 2010, Gervais and Merchant wrote, and had cameo roles in, Life's Too Short, a television show starring Warwick Davis. For television, Merchant and Gervais also produced An Idiot Abroad. In 2011, Merchant lent his voice to the CGI film Gnomeo & Juliet and had a role in the Farrelly brothers' comedy Hall Pass. In 2013 he starred in I Give It a Year as the best man.

On 18 October 2013, he hosted an episode of the panel show Have I Got News for You and was featured in Short Poppies. In 2014 he made an appearance in Modern Familys "Las Vegas" episode.

In January 2011, Merchant appeared alongside many other comedians at the 'Free Fringe Benefit' at the Bloomsbury Theatre, London, in a show of stand-up to benefit the Free Fringe at the Edinburgh Comedy Festival.

Merchant is the voice of Wheatley in Valve's 2011 video game Portal 2, a role which earned him widespread acclaim among reviewers. He has stated that while the project was "exhausting", he is also "very pleased by the response people have had to it. What I was really pleased by how people seemed to respond to it in the way they do with a movie they've enjoyed, or a TV show they've enjoyed." In 2013, he reprised this role as the voice of the Ap-Sap in Team Fortress 2, a weapon based on the Wheatley core.

Merchant has provided the voice-over since 2009 of advertisements for Barclays and Waterstones. In 2014, he starred in two commercials for Newcastle Brown Ale and for the Cadillac 2015 ATS Coupe.

He is an executive producer for the Spike show Lip Sync Battle and, in July 2015, Merchant opened his first play, The Mentalists by Richard Bean, alongside Steffan Rhodri in London's West End. He appeared in three episodes of The Big Bang Theory as Dave Gibbs, a guy Amy dates after she breaks up with Sheldon.

He has portrayed George Washington and Abraham Lincoln on the Comedy Central series Drunk History. Through the show's first four seasons, Merchant is the only actor to play the same historical figure (Lincoln) twice.

He hosted a special celebrity edition of the cult UK game show The Crystal Maze, on Channel 4 on 16 October 2016, in aid of the network's Stand Up to Cancer campaign in partnership with Cancer Research UK.

In 2017, Merchant played Caliban in The Wolverine sequel Logan. Merchant, along with John Krasinski and Allyson Seeger, are executive producers of Dream Corp, LLC, an animated series created by Daniel Stessen on Adult Swim. The series was announced as a pilot in May 2014, and a full season was approved in November 2015. Jon Gries of Lost fame will portray a principal character.

On 31 March 2018, Merchant was a star guest announcer on Ant & Dec's Saturday Night Takeaway. On Christmas Eve 2018, Merchant appeared with Asim Chaudhry in odd-couple Christmas road-trip comedy Click & Collect on BBC One. Merchant also appeared as Nazi Gestapo leader Captain Deertz in director Taika Waititi's Oscar-winning Jojo Rabbit.

In 2019, Merchant wrote and directed Fighting with My Family, a biographical sports comedy-drama film, based on the 2012 documentary The Wrestlers: Fighting with My Family by Max Fisher. The film depicts the career of English professional wrestler Paige as she makes her way up WWE, and starred Florence Pugh and Jack Lowden, as well as Dwayne Johnson (who also served as a co-producer). Fighting with My Family grossed $41.5 million worldwide against a budget of $11 million.

In 2021, Merchant starred in The Outlaws, a 12-part comedy drama set in Bristol, which he also co-wrote, co-produced, and co-directed.

Merchant portrayed serial killer Stephen Port in the BBC drama Four Lives.

Personal life
In December 2018, it was reported that Merchant was in a relationship with American actress Mircea Monroe. Merchant lives in a home previously owned by Ellen DeGeneres in the Nichols Canyon area of Los Angeles. He also owns a home in London.

Standing 6 ft 7 in (201 cm) tall with a lanky frame, Merchant once had his dance moves likened by Ricky Gervais to an "upright lizard being given electroshock treatment". Gervais also described him as a "stick insect with glasses" and Beaker from The Muppet Show. Karl Pilkington described Merchant's dancing as a "bit of weird art" but has since "got used to him", while Russell Brand likened him to a "graceful grasshopper". He has said that he prefers to liken himself to footballer Peter Crouch, who is the same height, and once impersonated Crouch in a BBC sketch broadcast as part of the pre-match build-up to England's opening game at the 2006 World Cup.

Before the 2010 UK general election, Merchant was one of 48 celebrities who signed a letter opposing the Conservative Party's policy on the BBC.

In December 2019, Merchant was the guest for an episode of BBC Radio 4's Desert Island Discs. His book choice was Roger's Profanisaurus by Roger Mellie from Viz, his luxury item was a piano, and his chosen record was "Thunder Road" by Bruce Springsteen.

Filmography

Film

Television

Video games

Awards

References

External links

Interviewed on BBC Radio Five Live
Xfm: Biography
Tall man, taller success story – interview in The Telegraph – 8 August 2005
 Interview with Barbara Ellen in The Observer Magazine – 5 November 2006
An Englishman abroad
Stephen Merchant interview 
Stephen Merchant interviewed by Sophie Elmhirst on New Statesman.

1974 births
Living people
20th-century English comedians
20th-century English male actors
21st-century English comedians
21st-century English male actors
Alumni of the University of Warwick
Audiobook narrators
BAFTA winners (people)
British male comedy actors
British male television writers
Emmy Award winners
English comedy writers
English expatriates in the United States
English male television actors
English male video game actors
English male voice actors
English podcasters
English radio DJs
English stand-up comedians
English television directors
English television producers
English television writers
Male actors from Bristol
Showrunners
Writers Guild of America Award winners
Spike Video Game Award winners